= West Wits mine =

Uranium mine in South Africa

- Location: Gauteng, South Africa
- Products: uranium

The West Wits mine is a large mine located in the northern part of South Africa in Gauteng. West Wits represents one of the largest uranium reserves in South Africa having estimated reserves of 173.9 million tonnes of ore grading 0.0059% uranium.
